This is a list of all Australia Davis Cup team results.

Key 

Key to Match result colours

All matches

1900s

1910s

1920s

1930s

1940s

1950s

1960s

1970s

1980s

1990s

2000s

2010s

2020s

Australia at World Team Cup

Australia at ATP Cup

Notes

External links 

Tennis in Australia
Australia national tennis team